The 2019 K3 League Advanced was the 13th and last season of amateur K3 League. After the end of the 2019 season, the K3 League was relaunched as a semi-professional league by Korea Football Association (KFA).

Icheon Citizen abandoned the last three matches of the regular season to avoid the spread of African swine fever virus, which could damage pig farms in Icheon.

Teams

Regular season

League table
The bottom two clubs were going to be relegated to the 2020 K4 League, but the original plan was cancelled after KFA decided that all K3 League clubs could choose for themselves whether to enter the K4 League.

Relegation playoff
The promotion-relegation playoff was contested between winners of Basic league playoff and 10th-placed team of Advanced league, but the match became meaningless after every K3 League club got an option to participate in the K4 League.

Championship playoffs
When the first round and semi-final matches were finished as draws, their winners were decided on the regular season rankings without extra time and the penalty shoot-out.

Bracket

First round

Semi-final

Final

Hwaseong FC won 2–0 on aggregate.

See also
 2019 in South Korean football
 2019 Korean FA Cup

References

External links

2019 in South Korean football